Great Renewed National Alliance, also known as GANAR Alliance or by its acronym GANAR (literally "WIN"), is a political coalition of opposition parties, formed in 2017 in Paraguay by members of the Authentic Radical Liberal Party, the Revolutionary Febrerista Party, the Progressive Democratic Party, the Guasú Front, and others. In the 2018 general elections, it was number 5 on the voting list, and supported Efraín Alegre of the PLRA and Leonardo Rubín of the Guasú Front for president and vice president, respectively.

The campaign leader of the Alliance was the liberal Carlos Mateo Balmelli, who was a past rival of Alegre in the PLRA internal elections.

References

External links
GANAR's Twitter account

2017 establishments in Paraguay
Social liberal parties
Political party alliances in Paraguay
Social democratic parties in South America
Democratic socialist parties in South America
Political parties established in 2017
Political parties in Paraguay